Sir Michael Otedola (16 July 1926 – 5 May 2014) was a Nigerian politician who served as Governor of Lagos State during the Nigerian Third Republic. 

He was born on the 16 July 1926 into a Muslim family at Odoragunsin, Epe Local Government Area of Lagos State. He died on 5 May 2014 at his residence in his home town of Epe, Lagos.

Early life
After moving to Lagos to pursue his education he won a scholarship to study Journalism at the Regent Street Polytechnic in London where he graduated in 1958.

He began his career as a teacher before working as a reporter at the St. Pancras Chronicle, then as a reporter and later sub-editor at The Guardian and The Times in England.

Politics
On his return to Nigeria in 1959 he became an Information Officer in the Western Nigeria government, and while in this post he was appointed the Editor of the Western Nigeria Illustrated.
In 1961 he moved into public relations, working for Western Nigeria Television/Western Broadcasting Service (1961-1964) and Mobil Oil Group of Companies (1964-1977), continuing as a consultant to Mobil after leaving the company.

He was elected governor of Lagos State from 1992 to 1993 on the platform of the National Republican Convention (NRC), leaving office when General Sani Abacha came to power.
His administration facilitated establishing the Yaba College of Technology campus in Epe, his home town.

After leaving office, he continued his career as a writer, a consultant holding positions on the boards of various businesses, and a philanthropist.
In February 2010 ThisDay newspaper announced that he was among 15 eminent Nigerians who had won Lifetime Achievement Awards.
His son Femi Otedola became the billionaire owner of Nigerian oil giant Zenon Petroleum and Gas Limited.
The Michael Otedola College of Primary Education was named after him after his demise.

See also
Femi Otedola
Temi Otedola

References

2014 deaths
1926 births
Yoruba politicians
Lagos State politicians
Alumni of the University of Westminster
National Republican Convention politicians
Governors of Lagos State
20th-century Nigerian politicians
Burials in Lagos State
Yaba College of Technology people
Michael
Knights of the Order of St. Sylvester